The 1st JOOX Thailand Music Awards was an awarding ceremony presented by JOOX Thailand, giving recognition to the Thai entertainment industry in the field of music for their achievements in the year 2016.

The awards night was held at the Centerpoint Studio, Bangkok, Thailand on Thursday, 23 March 2017 and broadcast through the JOOX app.

Awards 
Nominations were announced on 14 February 2017. Winners are listed first and highlighted in bold:

References 

2017
Joox